The gluteus medius, one of the three gluteal muscles, is a broad, thick, radiating muscle. It is situated on the outer surface of the pelvis.

Its posterior third is covered by the gluteus maximus, its anterior two-thirds by the gluteal aponeurosis, which separates it from the superficial fascia and integument.

Structure
The gluteus medius muscle starts, or "originates", on the outer surface of the ilium between the iliac crest and the posterior gluteal line above, and the anterior gluteal line below; the gluteus medius also originates from the gluteal aponeurosis that covers its outer surface.

The fibers of the muscle converge into a strong flattened tendon that inserts on the lateral surface of the greater trochanter. More specifically, the muscle's tendon inserts into an oblique ridge that runs downward and forward on the lateral surface of the greater trochanter.

Relations
A bursa separates the tendon of the muscle from the surface of the trochanter over which it glides.

Variations
The posterior border may be more or less closely united to the piriformis, or some of the fibers end on its tendon.

The posterior fibres of gluteus medius contract to produce hip extension, lateral rotation and abduction.  During gait, the posterior fibres help to decelerate internal rotation of the femur at the end of swing phase.

Function
 The anterior part acting alone helps to flex and internally rotate the hip.
 The posterior part acting alone helps to extend and externally rotate the hip.
 The anterior and posterior parts working together abduct the hip and stabilize the pelvis in the coronal plane.

Clinical significance
Dysfunction of the gluteus medius or the superior gluteal nerve can potentially be indicated by a positive Trendelenburg's sign.

Additional images

See also

 Trendelenburg gait

References

External links

 
 

Hip abductors
Hip lateral rotators
Hip medial rotators
Muscles of the gluteus
Hip muscles
Muscles of the lower limb